Dance to Death is a 2017 Russian science fiction film directed by Andrei Volgin.

Plot
The film takes place in 2070, when the world plunges into ruins as a result of nuclear war. The ability of people to survive depends on the energy emitted by the participants in the brutal dance tournament. But this system becomes endangered when one of the applicants falls in love with one of the contestants and decides to save her life.

Cast
Ivan Zhvakin as Kostya
Lukerya Ilyashenko as Anya
Nikita Volkov as Artyom
Alexander Tyutin as manager
Agniya Ditkovskite as Zebra
Denis Shvedov as Gray
Vladimir Epifantsev as tournament manager

Production

References

External links

Russian science fiction action films
2017 science fiction action films
2010s dance films
Russian post-apocalyptic films
Russian dystopian films
Films about death games
Films set in the 2070s
Films set in 2070